is a Japanese manga series written by Mari Okada and illustrated by Nao Emoto. It was serialized in Kodansha's shōnen manga magazine Bessatsu Shōnen Magazine from December 2016 to September 2019, with its chapters collected in eight tankōbon volumes. The manga is licensed in English by Kodansha USA.

An anime television series adaptation by Lay-duce was broadcast on MBS's Animeism programming block from July to September 2019. A live-action television series adaptation was broadcast from September to October 2020.

Characters

Portrayed by: Anna Yamada
Sugawara's friend and Izumi and Momoko's childhood friend. Since childhood, she has been in love with Izumi, but all this time she was afraid to take a step forward, while the mockery of more popular classmates did not motivate her to be more active in an attempt to attract his attention. However, as the story progresses, she notices that Izumi is clearly sexually attracted to Sugawara’s outstanding beauty and tenderness.

Portrayed by: Tina Tamashiro
Kazusa's friend, a melancholic girl who the guys call a "crane" because of her fragile beauty. Initially, Niina ignores the boys because of a harassment experience in her childhood but gradually begins to develop feelings for Izumi because of his caring and kindness. Thus, her loyalty to her friend and their common love of one boy quickly becomes one of the main conflicts of the story. She gets along well with Momoko, who quickly becomes her friend because of her adoration and unconscious romantic feelings for Sugawara.

Portrayed by: Mei Hata
A shy girl and best friend of Kazusa. Initially, she, like other girls, begins to be interested in relationships with guys, but as the story progresses, she is becoming more and more aware of her desire and interest in other girls, that the first time she perceives as a simple misunderstanding of the reasons for the girl's interest in guys. Subsequently, she begins to develop a one-sided crush on Sugawara, whose potential feelings for Izumi are causing her deep depression.

Portrayed by: Mayū Yokota
The president of a literary club, a tall, prudish girl who is ashamed of her interest in the opposite sex because of her strict upbringing and serious nature. Nevertheless, in spite of her purism, she gets the most healthy relationship with guys compared to other girls. Over time she comes to realize that romantic affection and sexual attraction are not the same thing, thus she begins to lower her guard and starts a relationship with Shun Amagi.

Portrayed by: Shuri Tanaka
A mysterious short girl who writes novels, including erotica. She maintains a relationship as Hitoto-san with Milo-san in an online adult chatroom. When her publisher describes her first novel as if it was written by a virgin 40-year-old man, she decides to gain sexual experience and arranges to meet up with Milo, discovering his identity as a member of the school faculty.

Portrayed by: Mizuki Inoue
Kazusa's childhood friend and the subject of interest from her and Sugawara. A kind and caring young guy, he doesn't have any sexual experience or knowledge about love in general, therefore his problems with the differentiation of love and sexual attraction quickly become the cause of a love triangle and a conflict between him and two girls.

Portrayed by: Yuki Furukawa
A young male teacher who is blackmailed into being the advisor for the Literature Club by Hitoha, in the absence of their former advisor and imminent disbanding. He is given the nickname Milo-sensei by Hitoha and is called by that nickname by the rest of the club. Hitoha later seems to develop a relationship with him that he is highly reluctant.

Portrayed by: Oshiro Maeda
A boy infatuated with Sonezaki even when her class looked down on her.

Portrayed by: Shingo Tsurumi
A famous director, who also works in acting classes for little children, including one Sugawara attended. 

A gyaru girl who Sonezaki detests, however she becomes friendlier to Sonezaki over time.

Portrayed by: Shunji Tagawa
A boy who attends the same cram school as Momoko and tries to start a relationship with her.

Media

Manga
O Maidens in Your Savage Season, written by Mari Okada and illustrated by Nao Emoto, was serialized in Kodansha's shōnen manga magazine Bessatsu Shōnen Magazine from December 9, 2016, to September 9, 2019.<ref></p></ref><ref></p></ref> Kodansha collected its chapters in eight tankōbon volumes, released from April 7, 2017, to October 9, 2019.

In North America, the manga was licensed for English release by Kodansha USA. The eight volumes were published from April 23, 2019, to November 3, 2020.

Volume list

Anime
An anime television series adaptation was announced on November 30, 2018. The series was animated by Lay-duce and directed by Masahiro Andō and Takurō Tsukada, with Mari Okada handling series composition, and Kaori Ishii designing the characters. Moe Hyūga composed the music. The series aired from July 5 to September 20, 2019, on the Animeism programming block on MBS, TBS, and BS-TBS, as well as AT-X. CHiCO with Honeyworks performed the series' opening theme song , while Momo Asakura performed the series' ending theme song . Sentai Filmworks has licensed the series worldwide excluding Asia, Germany, France, and Australia. In Southeast Asia and South Asia, Muse Communication holds the show's rights.

Episode list

Drama
A live-action television series adaptation was announced on July 9, 2020. On July 30, 2020, the main cast list and the production crew was announced, as well as that the series would be premiered on MBS and TBS on September 8, 2020.

Episode list

References

External links
O Maidens in Your Savage Season at Bessatsu Shōnen Magazine 
 

2019 anime television series debuts
Anime series based on manga
Animeism
Coming-of-age anime and manga
Kodansha manga
Lay-duce
Muse Communication
School life in anime and manga
Sentai Filmworks
Shōnen manga
Television shows written by Mari Okada